Franco-British alliance may refer to:
Entente Cordiale
Treaty of Dunkirk